William Gray "Bill" Daughtridge Jr. (December 19, 1952 – September 2, 2019) was a businessman from Rocky Mount, North Carolina, who served three terms from 2003 to 2008 as a Republican member of the North Carolina General Assembly representing the state's twenty-fifth House district, including constituents in Nash County.

Daughtridge's terms in office coincided with the peak activity of the Seven Bridges Road Killer.

Early life and education 
Born in Rocky Mount, Daughtridge was president of an oil distribution/transportation/retail company formed by his grandfather in 1929. He earned BS and MBA degrees at UNC-Chapel Hill, where he was a Morehead Scholar. Daughtridge has served on the North Carolina Economic Development Board, the Travel and Tourism Board and was appointed to numerous economic development positions while serving in the Legislature. In addition, Daughtridge served on the UNC Board of Governors as the Vice Chair of Budget, and Chair of Governance. Daughtridge served in the North Carolina National Guard from 1972 to 1978.

Political career 
While in office, his appointments included serving as the Commerce Committee Chairman, Small Business and Entrepreneurship Vice Chairman and serving as Co-Chair on the Joint Select Committee UNC Board of Governors and Economic Growth Development. Daughtridge ran for North Carolina State Treasurer in 2008. His only opponent in the primary election, State Representative Dale Folwell, dropped out. Daughtridge lost in the general election to Democratic State Senator Janet Cowell.

In 2011, Daughtridge became a senior advisor to new Speaker of the North Carolina House of Representatives Thom Tillis. In 2013, newly elected Governor Pat McCrory appointed him to serve as his Secretary of Administration.

He died in Rocky Mount on September 2, 2019 at the age of 66.

References

State cabinet secretaries of North Carolina
Republican Party members of the North Carolina House of Representatives
UNC Kenan–Flagler Business School alumni
2019 deaths
21st-century American politicians
1952 births
People from Rocky Mount, North Carolina